Mañana ("Tomorrow") is the third studio album from Sin Bandera. It was released on November 22, 2005.

Track listing

 Que Me Alcance La Vida
 No Voy
 A Ti
 Tócame
 Junto a Ti (feat. Vico C) (GMT Version)
 Lo Que Llamas Amor (feat. Yung Kuntry)
 Suelta Mi Mano
 Como Voy a Odiarte
 Como Tú y Como Yo (feat. Laura Pausini)
 No, No (feat. Yung Kuntry)
 La Razón Eres Tú (Look What You Make Me Do) (feat. Brian McKnight)
 Cuando Ya No Te Esperaba
 Junto a Ti (feat. Vico C) (Urban Version)

Charts

Weekly charts

Year-end charts

Sales and certifications

References

2005 albums
Albums produced by Brian McKnight
Sin Bandera albums